Qari Mazraehsi (also Romanized as Qārī Mazra‘ehsī; also known as Qārī Mazra‘ahsī) is a village in Arshaq-e Gharbi Rural District, Moradlu District, Meshgin Shahr County, Ardabil Province, Iran. Its population is 122, including 23 families, according to the 2006 census.

References 

Towns and villages in Meshgin Shahr County